Remo Bertoni (21 June 1909 – 18 September 1973) was an Italian professional road bicycle racer.

Bertoni was born in Borgomanero.  He is best known for his silver medal in the Elite race of the 1932 UCI Road World Championships.  He died, aged 64, in Milan.

Palmares 

1929
1st  National Road Championships, Road Race (Independants)
2nd UCI Road World Championships, Road Race

1930 
2nd Roma–Ascoli
2nd Giro dell'Umbria
5th Giro di Toscana

1931
1st GP Bendoni
1st GP Masnego
1st Stages 2 & 3, Giro di Campania
3rd Giro della Romagna

1932 
1st Treviso–Monte Grappa
2nd UCI Road World Championships, Road Race
2nd National Road Championships, Road Race
3rd Overall Giro d'Italia
1st Stage 11
3rd Giro di Lombardia
4th Giro di Toscana

1933
1st Pistoia–Prunetta
2nd National Road Championships, Road Race
2nd Tre Valli Varesine
3rd Giro delle Due Province Messina

1934
1st  Mountains Classification Giro d'Italia
1st Cittiglio–Leffe
1st Castellanza-Macugnaga
7th Giro di Toscana

1935
6th Overall Giro d'Italia

1939 
3rd National Cyclo-cross Championships

Results timelines

References

1909 births
1973 deaths
Italian male cyclists
Cyclists from Piedmont
People from Borgomanero